A gaslamp is a device that produces light by burning gas.

Gaslamp may also refer to:
Gaslamp Quarter, San Diego, historical heart of San Diego
Gaslamp Quarter (San Diego Trolley station) 
Gaslamp fantasy, a subgenre of historical and fantasy fiction
Gaslamp Games, a software development company